Piane d'Archi  is a frazione of Archi, in the Province of Chieti in the Abruzzo, region of Italy.

Frazioni of the Province of Chieti
Archi, Abruzzo